Sphingomonas naasensis  is a Gram-negative, aerobic and rod-shaped bacteria from the genus of Sphingomonas with a polar flagellum which has been isolated from forest soil on the Baengnyeong Island in Korea.

References

Further reading

External links
Type strain of Sphingomonas naasensis at BacDive -  the Bacterial Diversity Metadatabase

naasensis
Bacteria described in 2014